John Dunlay VC (1831 – 17 October 1890), also known as John Dunley or John Dunlea was an Irish recipient of the Victoria Cross, the highest and most prestigious award for gallantry in the face of the enemy that can be awarded to British and Commonwealth forces.

He was approximately 26 years old, and a Lance-Corporal in the 93rd Regiment of Foot (later The Argyll and Sutherland Highlanders), British Army during the Indian Mutiny when the following deed on 16 November 1857 at Lucknow, India, took place for which he was awarded the VC:

Secundra Bagh is a villa and country estate on the outskirts of Lucknow, India. 

Dunlea was born in Douglas, County Cork and died in the South Infirmary, Cork on 17 October 1890.

References

The Register of the Victoria Cross (1981, 1988 and 1997)

Ireland's VCs (Dept of Economic Development, 1995)
Monuments to Courage (David Harvey, 1999)
Irish Winners of the Victoria Cross (Richard Doherty & David Truesdale, 2000)

External links
 History of Argyll & Sutherland Highlanders
 Location of grave and VC medal in County Cork

1831 births
1890 deaths
19th-century Irish people
Irish soldiers in the British Army
People from County Cork
Argyll and Sutherland Highlanders soldiers
Irish recipients of the Victoria Cross
Indian Rebellion of 1857 recipients of the Victoria Cross
British Army recipients of the Victoria Cross
Military personnel from County Cork